Hardik AbhiNandan is a 2016 Gujarati Comedy starring veteran Gujarati actress Ragini Shah and debutant actors  Devarshi Shah, Gopal Parmar, Navjot Singh Chauhan in the lead roles as the characters Hardik, Abhi and Nandan respectively. The film is directed by Dev Keshwala and produced by Kamdhenu Entertainments LLP in association with DN Entertainment. Music is composed by Jigardan Gadhavi. Background score of the film is produced by Sameer Phaterpekar.

Plot 
Hardik, Abhi and Nandan are three small town boys who come to the metropolis Ahmedabad to pursue their graduate studies. The trio ends up living together as paying guests in the home of Mukta Masi (Ragini Shah).
Owing to their individual quirks and unhinged new-found freedom, the three end up living extravagant and reckless lives. In the process, they go through a series of misadventures and find themselves at the center of an unfolding mystery.
This coming-of-age tale with an important message is centered around the theme where culture shock plays a major role in leading youth astray and how close relationships can help us cope with the realities of life.

Cast 

 Ragini Shah as Mukta Masi
 Devarshi Shah as Hardik Mochi
 Gopal Parmar as Abhimanyusingh Zala
 Navjot Singh Chauhan as Nandan Patel
 Vimmy Bhatt as Aarti
 Akash Zala as Pappu Bhai 
 Poojan Trivedi as Mohit
 Mitesh Moga as Dhaval

References 

2016 films
Films set in Gujarat
Films set in Ahmedabad
Films shot in Ahmedabad
Films shot in Gujarat
2010s Gujarati-language films